Covert sites of the Laotian Civil War were clandestine U.S. military installations for conducting covert paramilitary and combat operations in the Kingdom of Laos. Airstrips within the Kingdom of Laos were originally designated by Air America as "Site XX" (with XX being a number). In September 1961, the designation changed to "VS XX", meaning "Victor Site XX". On 16 May 1964, the airstrips received their final designation; the site names then used the abbreviation "LS"—Lima Site—for unimproved strips, or "L"—Lima—for paved runways. The terms "Victor" and "Lima" were taken from the existing military phonetic code.

These sites typically were centered on a dirt landing strip for STOL aircraft such as the Air America Helio Courier or Pilatus Porter. These strips were often carved out along ridge lines, and were seldom flat, straight, or of sufficient length. However, they were crucial for resupply and personnel transport, including medical evacuations. To quote one source: "Some of these defied all the safety rules even of military aviation." A U.S. Air Force inspection team noted that even the best of the Lima strips was inferior to any air strips in Vietnam. Listing follows.

See also
Laotian Civil War
Kingdom of Laos
North Vietnamese invasion of Laos
People's Army of Vietnam
Hmong people
Lao Veterans of America
Laos Memorial
Lao Veterans of America Institute

Notes

Bibliography
 Ahern, Thomas L. Jr. (2006). Undercover Armies: CIA and Surrogate Warfare in Laos. Center for the Study of Intelligence. Classified control no. C05303949.
 Conboy, Kenneth and James Morrison (1995). Shadow War: The CIA's Secret War in Laos. Paladin Press, ISBNs 0-87364-825-0, 978-1-58160-535-8.
 Hukle, Donald G.; Melvin F. Porter; Paul T. Ringenbach; Richard R. Sexton; Judith A. Skipworth; Adolph H. Zabka. (1974). The Bolovens Campaign, 28 July - 28 December 1971 (Project CHECO Southeast Asia Report). Pacific Air Force CHECO Division. ASIN: B00B65VIOU.

Civil War
Laotian Civil War
Laotian Civil War
Covert sites